Safa Sporting Club is a football club based in Wata El Msaytbeh, a district in Beirut, Lebanon, that competes in the . Founded in 1939, they won three league titles, three domestic cups, one Super Cup, and two Elite Cups; they have also reached the 2008 AFC Cup final.

Safa primarily receives its support from Wata El-Museitbeh, as well as the Druze community all over Lebanon. Given their fanbase extends well in Mount Lebanon, including the city of Aley, they play the Mountain derby with Akhaa Ahli Aley.

History
Founded in 1933 at an amateur level in the Wata El-Museitbeh of Beirut, Safa Sporting Club was officially established in 1939 by seven people: Maher Wahab, Anis Naaim, Hasib Al-Jerdi, Amin Haidar, Chafik Nader, Toufik Al-Zouhairy and Adib Haidar.

On 23 December 1948, Safa obtained the official membership and license from the government as a private association. In the same year, the club was affiliated to the Lebanese Football Association and was ranked within the Second Division. In 1961, Safa was promoted to the First Division.

After finishing the 2021–22 Lebanese Premier League in 11th place, Safa were due to be relegated to the Second Division for the first time. However, following Shabab Bourj's withdrawal from the league, they were relegated in place of Safa.

Kit manufacturers
The following is a list of kit manufacturers worn by Safa.

Stadium

The Safa Stadium opened in 1948, and has a capacity of 4,000 spectators. Located in the Wata El-Museitbeh district of Beirut, the stadium is five minutes from the Beirut–Rafic Hariri International Airport. While the stadium is of Safa's property, the club plays in various other stadiums around the country.

Club rivalries 
Safa has important rivalries with Ansar and Nejmeh, both being based in Beirut. Safa also plays the Mountain derby with Akhaa Ahli, as Akhaa is based in Aley, a city in Mount Lebanon, and Safa's support comes from the Druze community in Lebanon, who mainly live in Chouf and Aley districts.

Players

Current squad

Notable players

Honours

Domestic 
 Lebanese Premier League
 Winners (3): 2011–12, 2012–13, 2015–16
 Lebanese FA Cup
Winners (3): 1964–65, 1986–87, 2012–13
Runners-up (8): 1970–71, 1989–90, 1990–91, 1994–95, 1999–2000, 2007–08, 2010–11, 2016–17
 Lebanese Elite Cup
Winners (2): 2009, 2012
Runners-up (3): 2011, 2014, 2015
 Lebanese Super Cup
Winners (1): 2013
Runners-up (3): 2011, 2012, 2016
 Lebanese Second Division
Winners (1): 1960–61 (Beirut)

Continental 
 AFC Cup
 Runners-up (1): 2008

Other achievements 
 Lebanese Challenge Cup
Runners-up (1): 2022

Performance in AFC competitions
AFC Cup: 5 appearances
2008: Final
2009: Round of 16
2012: Group stage
2013: Group stage
2014: Round of 16

Asian Cup Winners' Cup: 2 appearances
1992–93: Withdrew in first round
2000–01: Withdrew in first round

Managerial history

 Walid Zeineddine
 Mahmoud Saad
 Akram Salman
 Ghassan Abou Diab
 Samir Saad
 Emile Rustom
 Valeriu Tița (2013–2014)
 Emile Rustom (2015–2018)
 Valeriu Tița (2018–2019)
 Tarek Jarraya (2019)
 Robert Jaspert (2019–2020)
 Emile Rustom (2020)
 Mohammad Dakka (2020–2021)
 Fadi Oumari (2021–22)
 Malek Hassoun (2022)
 Youssef Jawhari (2022–present)

See also 
 Safa WFC, women's team
 List of football clubs in Lebanon

Notes

References

External links

 Safa SC at the AFC
 Safa SC at FA Lebanon
 

 
Football clubs in Lebanon
1939 establishments in Lebanon
Association football clubs established in 1939